Colin Greenland (born 17 May 1954 in Dover, Kent, England) is a British science fiction writer, whose first story won the second prize in a 1982 Faber & Faber competition. His best-known novel is Take Back Plenty (1990), winner of both major British science fiction awards, the 1990 British SF Association award and the 1991 Arthur C. Clarke Award, as well as being a nominee for the 1992 Philip K. Dick Award for the best original paperback published that year in the United States.

Biography 

Colin Greenland attended Pembroke College, Oxford, eventually earning a BA, MA (1978), and DPhil (1981). Greenland's first published book, which was based on his DPhil dissertation, was a critical look at the New Wave entitled The Entropy Exhibition: Michael Moorcock and the British 'New Wave' in Science Fiction (1983). His most successful fictional work is the Plenty series that starts with Take Back Plenty and continues with Seasons of Plenty (1995), The Plenty Principle (1997) and Mother of Plenty (1998).

Besides his work on fiction, Greenland has continued to write non-fiction books and has been active in the Science Fiction Foundation, as well as serving on the editorial committee of Interzone. He has been a guest speaker at four separate Microcons: 1988, 1989, 1993 and 1994.

His partner is the novelist Susanna Clarke, with whom he has lived since 1996.

He is good friends with Neil Gaiman, and is frequently cited among Gaiman's acknowledgments pages.

Bibliography

Novels
 Daybreak series
 Daybreak on a Different Mountain. London: Unwin Hyman, 1984. 
 The Hour of the Thin Ox. London: Unwin Hyman, 1987. 
 Other Voices. London: Unwin Hyman, 1988. 
 Plenty series
 Take Back Plenty. London: Unwin Hyman, 1990 (paper). 
 Seasons of Plenty. London: HarperCollins, 1995. 
 Mother of Plenty. London: HarperCollins Voyager, 1998 (paper). 
 Harm's Way. London: HarperCollins, 1993. 
 Spiritfeather. London: Orion, 2000 (paper). 
 Finding Helen. London: Black Swan, 2002 (paper).

Collections
 The Plenty Principle. London: HarperCollins Voyager, 1997 (paper).

Non-fiction
 The Entropy Exhibition: Michael Moorcock and the British 'New Wave' in Science Fiction. London: Routledge & Keegan, 1983. 
 Storm Warnings: Science Fiction Confronts the Future, with Eric S. Rabkin and George E. Slusser. Carbondale, IL: Southern Illinois University Press, 1987. 
 Michael Moorcock: Death is No Obstacle. Manchester: Savoy Books, 1992.

As editor
Interzone: The First Anthology, with John Clute and David Pringle. London: Everyman Fiction, 1985.

References

Sources
 Clute, John and Peter Nicholls. The Encyclopedia of Science Fiction. New York: St. Martin's Griffin 1993 (2nd edition 1995). .
 Reginald, Robert. Science Fiction and Fantasy Literature, 1975-1991. Detroit, Washington DC, London: Gale Research, Inc., 1992. .

External links
 Colin Greenland – an infinity plus profile – retrieved 12 September 2005
 SF Hub: Colin Greenland archive – retrieved 12 September 2005
 
 Colin Greenland Bibliography – retrieved 12 September 2005
 P-CON III: Guest Profile: Colin Greenland – retrieved 12 September 2005

1954 births
Living people
English science fiction writers
People from Dover, Kent
English male novelists